The umlaut is the diacritical mark  used to indicate in writing (as part of the letters , , and ) the result of the historical sound shift due to which former back vowels are now pronounced as front vowels (for example , , and  as , , and ). (The term [Germanic] umlaut is also used for the underlying historical sound shift process.) 

In its contemporary printed form, the mark consists of two dots placed over the letter to represent the changed vowel sound. It looks identical to the diaeresis mark used in other European languages and is represented by the same Unicode code point. The word trema, used in linguistics and also classical scholarship, describes the form of both the umlaut diacritic and the diaeresis rather than their function and can therefore be used to refer to both.

German origin and current usage 
 (literally "changed sound") is the German name of the sound shift phenomenon also known as i-mutation. In German, this term is also used for the corresponding letters ä, ö, and ü (and the diphthong äu) and the sounds that these letters represent. But the diacritical mark is called  (literally "umlaut sign") in German, not Umlaut.

In German, the umlaut diacritic indicates that the short back vowels and the diphthong  are pronounced ("shifted forward in the mouth") as follows:
  → 
  → 
  → 
  → 
And the long back vowels are pronounced in the front of the mouth as follows:
  → very formal/old fashioned , in most speakers  (resulting in a merger with )
  → 
  → 

History 

The Germanic umlaut is a specific historical phenomenon of vowel-fronting in German and other Germanic languages, including English. English examples are 'man ~ men' and 'foot ~ feet' (from Proto-Germanic , pl. ), but English orthography does not indicate this vowel change using the umlaut diacritic.

German phonological umlaut was present in the Old High German period and continued to develop in Middle High German. From the Middle High German period, it was sometimes denoted in written German by adding an e to the affected vowel, either after the vowel or, in small form, above it. This can still be seen in some names, e.g. Goethe, Goebbels, Staedtler. In medieval German manuscripts, other digraphs were also commonly written using superscripts. This letter survives now only in Czech. Compare also  for the digraph nn, with the tilde as a superscript .

In the forms of handwriting that emerged in the early modern period (of which Sütterlin is the latest and best-known example) the letter  was composed of two short vertical lines very close together, and the superscript  looked like two tiny strokes. Even from the 16th century, the handwritten convention of indicating umlaut by two dots placed above the affected vowel is also found in printed texts.

Unusual umlaut designs are sometimes also created for graphic design purposes, such as to fit umlaut dots into tightly spaced lines of text. This may include umlaut dots placed vertically or inside the body of the letter.

Printing conventions in German  
So, for example, "Schröder" becomes "Schroeder". As the pronunciation differs greatly between the normal letter and the umlaut, simply omitting the dots would be incorrect. The result would often be a different word, as in  "already",  "beautiful"; or a different grammatic form, e.g. "mother",  "mothers".

Despite this, the umlauted letters are not considered to be separate letters of the alphabet in German, in contrast to the situation in other Germanic languages.

When alphabetically sorting German words, the umlaut is usually not distinguished from the underlying vowel, although if two words differ only by an umlaut, the umlauted one comes second, for example:
 schon
 schön
 schonen

There is a second system in limited use, mostly for sorting names (colloquially called "telephone directory sorting"), which treats ü like ue, and so on.
 schön
 schon
 schonen

Austrian telephone directories insert ö after oz.
 schon
 schonen
 schön

This is because the Swiss typewriter keyboard contains the French accents on the same keys as the umlauts (selected by Shift). To write capital umlauts, the -key (the dead key ¨) is pressed and released before pressing the shift key and the letter.

Borrowing of German umlaut notation 
Some languages have borrowed some of the forms of the German letters Ä, Ö, or Ü, including Azerbaijani, Estonian, Finnish, Hungarian, Karelian, some of the Sami languages, Slovak, Swedish, and Turkish. This indicates sounds similar to the corresponding umlauted letters in German. In spoken Scandinavian languages the grammatical umlaut change is used (singular to plural, derivations, etc.) but the character used differs between languages. In Finnish, a/ä and o/ö change systematically in suffixes according to the rules of vowel harmony. In Hungarian, where long vowels are indicated with an acute accent, the umlaut notation has been expanded with a version of the umlaut which looks like double acute accents, indicating a blend of umlaut and acute. Contrast: short ö; long ő.

Slovak uses the letter  to denote  (or a bit archaic but still correct ). The similar word   ("double dot") however refers to the colon.

In these languages, with the exception of Hungarian, the replacement rule for situations where the umlaut character is not available, is to simply use the underlying unaccented character instead.

The letters  and  do not occur in native Luxembourgish words, but at least the former is common in words borrowed from standard German.

These Turkish graphemes represent sounds similar to their respective values in German (see Turkish alphabet).

In Estonian and Finnish, for example, these latter diphthongs have independent meanings. Even some Germanic languages, such as Swedish (which does have a transformation analogous to the German umlaut, called ), treat them always as independent letters. In collation, this means they have their own positions in the alphabet, for example at the end ("A–Ö" or "A–Ü", not "A–Z") as in Swedish, Estonian and Finnish, which means that the dictionary order is different from German. The transformations ä → ae and ö → oe can, therefore, be considered less appropriate for these languages, although Swedish and Finnish passports use the transformation to render ö and ä (and å as aa) in the machine-readable zone. In contexts of technological limitation, e.g. in English based systems, Swedes can either be forced to omit the diacritics or use the two letter system.

When typing in Norwegian, the letters Æ and Ø might be replaced with Ä and Ö respectively if the former are not available. If ä is not available either, it is appropriate to use ae. The same goes for ö and oe. While ae has a great resemblance to the letter æ and, therefore, does not impede legibility, the digraph oe is likely to reduce the legibility of a Norwegian text. This especially applies to the digraph øy, which would be rendered in the more cryptic form oey. Also in Danish, Ö has been used in place of Ø in some older texts and to distinguish between open and closed ö-sounds and when confusion with other symbols could occur, e.g. on maps. The Danish/Norwegian Ø is like the German Ö a development of OE, to be compared with the French Œ.

Early Volapük used Fraktur a, o and u as different from Antiqua ones. Later, the Fraktur forms were replaced with umlauted vowels.

The usage of umlaut-like diacritic vowels, particularly ü, occurs in the romanization of languages that do not use the Roman alphabet, such as Chinese. For example, Mandarin Chinese   ("female") is romanized as nǚ in Hanyu Pinyin. Tibetan pinyin uses ä, ö, ü with approximately their German values.

These directly parallel the German umlaut ä, ö, ü. Other vowels using a double dot to modify their values in various minority languages of Russia are ӛ, ӫ, and ӹ.

Use of the umlaut for special effect 

The two dot diacritic can be used in "sensational spellings" or foreign branding, for example in advertising, or for other special effects, where it is usually called an umlaut (rather than a diaeresis). Mötley Crüe, Blue Öyster Cult, Motörhead and Häagen-Dazs are examples of such usage.

Subscript umlaut
The International Phonetic Alphabet uses a double dot below a letter, a notation it calls "subscript umlaut" to indicate breathy (murmured) voice, (for example Hindi  "potter".)  The ALA-LC romanization system provides for its use and is one of the  main schemes to romanize Persian (for example, rendering  as ). The notation was used to write some Asian languages in Latin script, for example Red Karen.

See also
 Two dots (disambiguation)

Explanatory notes

References

External links 

Latin-script diacritics
Greek-script diacritics
Cyrillic-script diacritics